Arhopala athada, the vinous oakblue is a species of butterfly belonging to the lycaenid family described by Otto Staudinger in 1889. It is found in Southeast Asia - Singapore, Peninsular Malaya, Sumatra, Borneo, Bangka, Bawean (A. a. athada), Assam, Burma, Mergui, Thailand (A. a. apha de Nicéville, 1895) and the Philippines (A. a. wilemani (Evans, 1957)).

Subspecies
Arhopala athada athada (Singapore, Peninsular Malaysia, Sumatra, Borneo, Bangka, Bawean)
Arhopala athada apha de Nicéville, 1895 (Assam, Burma, Mergui, Thailand)
Arhopala athada wilemani (Evans, 1957) (Philippines: Mindanao)
Arhopala athada minor (Evans, 1957) (Bachan)
Arhopala athada baweana Eliot, 1972 (Bawean)

References

Arhopala
Butterflies described in 1889
Taxa named by Otto Staudinger
Butterflies of Asia